Baa Nanna Preethisu (Kannada: ಬಾ ನನ್ನ ಪ್ರೀತಿಸು) is a 1992 Indian Kannada film, directed and produced by Siddalingaiah. The film stars Shashikumar, Soundarya, Madhuri and Aravind in the lead roles. The film's musical score was composed by Rajan–Nagendra.

Cast

Shashikumar
Soundarya
Madhuri
Aravind
Rajaram
Kalabhairava Gangadhar
Girija Lokesh
Lokesh
Sanatani

Soundtrack 
"Andu Ninna Kandaagale" - S. P. Balasubrahmanyam, Manjula Gururaj
"Manadaase Nooru" - S. P. Balasubrahmanyam, Manjula Gururaj
"Ondu Beku Eradu Saaku" - S. P. Balasubrahmanyam, Manjula Gururaj 
"Baaro Baaro Maleraaya" - S. P. Balasubrahmanyam
"Kempegowdre" - S. P. Balasubrahmanyam

References

1992 films
1990s Kannada-language films
Films scored by Rajan–Nagendra